Karel Hromádka (23 April 1887 in Großweikersdorf, Austria – 16 July 1956) was a Czech chess player, two-time Czech champion, 1913 and 1921 (jointly).

Hromádka played in the 1st unofficial Chess Olympiad, Paris 1924, and scored 6.5/8 for first place in the Consolation Cup. In Qualification Group 1 he finished in third place. Hromádka played in the 1st Chess Olympiad, London 1927, and scored +4 =3 -5. Notably, he also had a plus score against Siegbert Tarrasch (+2 -0 =0).

The name Hromádka Indian Defense is sometimes given to the chess opening 1.d4 Nf6 2.Nf3 c5 3.d5 d6 4.c4 e5, otherwise known as the Czech Benoni or the Old Benoni.

References

External links 
 

1887 births
1956 deaths
20th-century Czech people
Czech chess players
Chess Olympiad competitors
Chess theoreticians
Czech expatriate sportspeople in Austria
People from Tulln District